Amiens Sporting Club (commonly referred to as Amiens SC or simply Amiens) is a French association football club based in the northern city of Amiens in the Hauts-de-France region. The club was formed in 1901 and play in Ligue 2, the second division of French football. The club plays its home matches at the Stade de la Licorne located within the city. The 2017–18 Ligue 1 season was the first in the club's 116-year history, where they finished in 13th place to secure a position in Ligue 1 for the following year. Amiens have never won a major trophy.

History 
Amiens Athlétic Club (AAC) was set up in 1901 by a group of players from the Association du Lycée d'Amiens, French schoolboy champions in 1902, 1903, and 1904. AAC crushed its first opponents, Saint-Quentin, 13–0 a few months after its creation. In April 1902, the Comité de Picardie de l'U.S.F.S.A was established by the then-president of the AAC (Henri-Frédéric Petit). AAC dominated the early USFSA league for the first 12 seasons. In 1909, the club got a new ground, at the Henry Daussy Park, allowing an attendance of more than 1,000.

In 1933, the club got its first professional section, later abandoned in 1952, before becoming professional again in 1993. Since the early days, AAC has undergone two name changes: In 1961, to Sporting Club d'Amiens, and in 1989, as Amiens Sporting Club. Amiens played in Ligue 2 between 2001 and 2009.

The team made a return to the second tier of French football for the 2016–17 season, after finishing 3rd in the Championnat National. Their first season back in Ligue 2 was the most successful ever, as they finished runners-up and were promoted to top-tier Ligue 1 for the first time ever. It was a dramatic promotion, too, as they would have dropped out of the promotion places but for a last-gasp winning goal in the final game against Reims. Amiens first season in Ligue 1 ended in survival with a comfortable 13th-placed finish on the table.

In the 2018–19 season, Amiens finished in 15th place on the table and secured their survival after a 2–1 victory over already relegated EA Guingamp.

Despite this, during the 2019–20 season with just 10 games to play, the side sat in 19th position having slipped down the table after a modest start, sitting just 4 points behind 18th placed Nîmes. The LFP suspended Ligue 1 and Ligue 2 indefinitely as a result of the coronavirus outbreak, and on 30 April 2020, the league title was awarded to Paris Saint-Germain and thus the bottom two placed teams, Amiens and Toulouse were automatically relegated to Ligue 2 for the 2020–21 season.

Players

Current squad

Out on loan

Current technical staff

Notable former players 
Below are the notable former players who have represented Amiens and its predecessors in league and international competition since the club's foundation in 1901. To appear in the section below, a player must have played in at least 80 official matches for the club.

For a list of former Amiens players, see :Category:Amiens SC players.

 Fabrice Abriel
 Stéphane Adam
 Joël Beaujouan
 Thierry Bonalair
 Antoine Buron
 David De Freitas
 Jean-Louis Delecroix
 Emmanuel Duchemin
 Thibault Giresse
 Stéphane Hernandez
 Sébastien Heitzmann
 Julien Lachuer
 Arnaud Lebrun
 Eric Luc Leclerc
 Jean Mankowski
 Pierre Mankowski
 Cyrille Merville
 Olivier Pickeu
 David Vairelles
 Lakhdar Adjali
 Titi Buengo
 Fernando Casartelli
 Joël Sami
 Oscar Ewolo
 Jean-Paul Abalo
 Fahid Ben Khalfallah

Managers 

 Ferenc Kónya (1933–34)
 Jules Limbeck (1934–35)
 Raymond Demey (1935–36)
 Louis Finot (1942–43)
 Kaj Andrup (1945–46)
 Pierre Illiet (1946–47)
 Mony Braunstein (1947–48)
 André Riou (1950–51)
 Édouard Harduin (1958–59)
 Jean Mankowski (1959–60)
 Emilien Méresse (1960–68)
 André Grillon (1968–77)
 Robert Buchot (1977–79)
 Paul Pruvost (1979 – December 79)
 Robert Buchot (December 1979–80)
 Claude Le Roy and Paul Pruvost (1980–81)
 Claude Le Roy (1981–83)
 Gabriel Desmenez (1983–85)
 Camille Choquier (1985–87)
 Joël Beaujouan (1987 – April 1988)
 Hughes Jullien (April 1988–92)
 Patrick Parizon (1992–94)
 Arnaud Dos Santos (1994 – November 1998)
 René Marsiglia (November 1998 – February 2000)
 Victor Zvunka (February 2000–00)
 Denis Troch (2000–04)
 Alex Dupont (2004 – March 2006)
 Ludovic Batelli (March 2006–08)
 Thierry Laurey (March 2008 – June 2009)
 Serge Romano (June 2009 – October 2009)
 Ludovic Batelli (October 2009 – June 2012)
 Francis De Taddeo (July 2012 – September 2013)
 Olivier Echouafni (September 2013 – 2014)
 Samuel Michel (June 2014– December 2014)
 Christophe Pélissier (December 2014– June 2019)
 Luka Elsner (July 2019– present)

Honours 
Championnat de France/Ligue 1
Runners-Up (1): 1926–27
Coupe de France
Runners-Up (1): 2000–01
Championnat National
Champions (1): 1977–78
Division d'Honneur (Nord)
Champions (4): 1924, 1927, 1957, 1963
Division d'Honneur (Picardie)
Champions (2): 1920, 1921
USFSA League (Picardie)
Champions (11): 1903, 1904, 1905, 1906, 1908, 1909, 1910, 1911, 1912, 1913, 1914

References

External links 

 

 
Association football clubs established in 1901
1901 establishments in France
Sport in Amiens
Football clubs in France
Football clubs in Hauts-de-France
Ligue 1 clubs